John Tocher (29 September 1925 – 17 September 1991) was a British trade unionist and communist activist.

Tocher worked in factories from the age of fourteen, but hoped to work on aeroplanes.  When he reached eighteen, he was accepted into the Army Air Corps, serving until the end of World War II, when he returned to complete an apprenticeship at Avro.  He joined the Amalgamated Engineering Union (AEU), becoming a shop steward and then workplace convener at Woodford.

In 1957, Tocher was elected as the AEU's Stockport District President, and became a delegate to the union's national committee.  He became its Stockport District Secretary in 1964, then a full-time assistant divisional organiser, and eventually a divisional organiser.  He also joined the Communist Party of Great Britain (CPGB), serving on its executive from 1963.

Tocher led a strike at Roberts Arundel in 1967 and 1968, against efforts to replace experienced workers with women, who the managers expected would work for lower pay and in worse conditions.  While the strike was largely unsuccessful, Tocher was lauded for his leadership, and was elected as chair of the CPGB.

Tocher however held that the strike had been successful

Tocher remained a prominent union figure, leading industrial action in support of a 35-hour working week in 1972.  He stood down from the CPGB executive in 1973.  Having married and with young children, harassment resulting from negative articles about him in the press led him to resign from the CPGB, although he remained sympathetic to its principles.  He remained an active trade unionist, and stood unsuccessfully to become president of the AEU in 1985.

Tocher was due to retire in late September 1991, but he died a week beforehand.

References

1925 births
1991 deaths
British Army personnel of World War II
Communist Party of Great Britain members
English trade unionists